is a passenger railway station located in the city of Kōnosu, Saitama, Japan, operated by East Japan Railway Company (JR East) .

Lines
Fukiage Station is served by the Takasaki Line, with through Shōnan-Shinjuku Line and Ueno-Tokyo Line services to and from the Tōkaidō Line.

Station layout
The station has a side platform and an island platform serving three tracks, connected by a footbridge, with an elevated station building located above the platforms. The station has a "Midori no Madoguchi" staffed ticket office.

Platforms

History 
The station opened on 1 March 1885. The station became part of the JR East network after the privatization of the JNR on 1 April 1987.

Passenger statistics
In fiscal 2019, the station was used by an average of 8,899 passengers daily (boarding passengers only).

Surrounding area
Fukiage Post Office
former Fukiage Town Hall

See also
List of railway stations in Japan

References

External links

 JR East station information 

Railway stations in Saitama Prefecture
Railway stations in Japan opened in 1885
Takasaki Line
Stations of East Japan Railway Company
Shōnan-Shinjuku Line
Kōnosu